The administration of Judaea as a province of Rome from 6 to 135 was carried out primarily by a series of Roman Prefects, Procurators, and Legates. These administrators coincided with the ostensible rule by Hasmonean and Herodian rulers of Judea. The Roman administrators were as follows:

"Hadrian stationed an extra legion in Judaea, renaming it Syria Palaestina." This was following the defeat of the Bar Kokhba Revolt in 135. The Syria-based legion, Legio III Gallica, took part in the quelling of the revolt in 132–136, and in the aftermath, the emperor Hadrian renamed the greatly depopulated province of Judea and its extra legion Syria Palaestina. The province of Syria Palaestina was divided into Palaestina Prima and Palaestina Salutaris in about 357, and by 409 Palaestina Prima had been further split into a smaller Palaestina Prima and Palaestina Secunda, while Salutaris was named Tertia or Salutaris. Palæstina Prima or Palaestina I existed from the late 4th century until it was temporarily lost to the Sassanid Empire (Persian Empire) in 614, but re-conquered in 628 and finally until the Muslim conquest of the Levant in the 630s.

See also
 Kings of Israel
 Kings of Judah
 Herodian Dynasty
 List of High Priests of Israel
 Syria Palaestina
 Promagistrate

References

Sources
 
 
 

Judea
Judea (Roman province)
Lists of office-holders in ancient Rome
 
Judea